Sarajevo's Ozren is complex of mountains and hilly plateaus located northeast of Sarajevo. This entire area is covered by a number of different paths and hiking trails, and it has popular picnic areas (Barice, Čavljak, Pjeskovita Ravan), popular for people from Sarajevo.

Geography 

Sarajevo's Ozren consists of several main parts:

 Ozren-mountain (Ozren in the narrow sense), includes Motka, Visojevica, area Ozren-Bandijera
 Plateau Crepoljsko, includes area of Crepoljsko, area Crni Vrh (near Vučija Luka) and southeast ridges over Miljacka
 Mountain ridge Bukovik, includes main ridge Bukovik and Nahorevo hills - Bijelosava
 Hill Hum (in Sarajevo)

Highest peak of Sarajevo's Ozren is Bukovik (1534 m), and second highest is Crepoljsko (1524 m).

Skakavac waterfall, a declared natural monument is also located in Sarajevo's Ozren.

References 

Sarajevo Canton
Mountains of Bosnia and Herzegovina
Istočno Sarajevo